Waconia may refer to a community in the United States:

 Waconia, Minnesota
 Waconia Township, Carver County, Minnesota
 Lake Waconia